Csaba Leimeter (born 15 December 1994) is a Hungarian handball player who plays for RK Zagreb and the Hungarian national team.

Career

Club
He made his debut in the Hungarian first division in February 2011 in the PLER KC team. He played here until the end of the 2015-2016 season, when PLER KC was relegated from the Hungarian first division. In the summer of 2016, he transferred to Grundfos Tatabánya KC, where he presented himself on the international stage, in the EHF Cup. In Tatabánya, the Romanian international Demis Grigoraș played in his position, so he had few opportunities, so he left for the Budakalász FKC team after 1 year. In the summer of 2019, he joined the team of Csurgói KK. It was from there that he was bought out by the Croatian record champion, RK Zagreb, in February 2021. From the summer of 2023, he transferred to the German team HBW Balingen-Weilstetten.

National team
He played for the first time on November 4, 2020, in the Hungarian national team in Veszprém against Spain. He was included in the large squad of the 2022 European Men's Handball Championship, but in the end he did not become a member of the narrow squad.

Honours

Club
Grundfos Tatabánya KC
Nemzeti Bajnokság I
: 2017
Magyar Kupa
: 2017

RK Zagreb
Croatian Premier Handball League
: 2021, 2022
Croatian Handball Cup
: 2021, 2022
SEHA League
: 2021, 2022

References

External links
 Csaba Leimeter at EHF 

Hungarian male handball players
Living people
1994 births
RK Zagreb players